Timbiqui is a town and municipality in the Cauca Department, Colombia.
An earthquake affected its inhabitants on the first of October, 2012.

Climate
Like all the Pacific coast of Colombia, Timbiquí has a very wet tropical rainforest climate (Köppen Af).

References

Municipalities of Cauca Department